The 1965 All-Atlantic Coast Conference football team consists of American football players chosen by various selectors for their All-Atlantic Coast Conference ("ACC") teams for the 1965 NCAA University Division football season. Selectors in 1965 included the Associated Press (AP) and the United Press International (UPI).  Players selected to the first team by both the AP and UPI are displayed below in bold.

All-Atlantic Coast Conference selections

Offensive selections

Ends
 J. R. Wilburn, South Carolina (AP-1, UPI-1)
 Chuck Drulis, Duke (AP-1, UPI-1)

Offensive tackles
 Johnny Boyette, Clemson (AP-1, UPI-1)
 Bill Jones, Duke (AP-1)
 Dave Ellis, North Carolina State (UPI-1)

Offensive guards
 John McNabb, Duke (AP-1, UPI-1)
 John Stec, North Carolina State (AP-1, UPI-1)

Centers
 Ed Stringer, North Carolina (AP-1, UPI-1)

Backs
 Danny Talbott, North Carolina (AP-1, UPI-1)
 Hugh Mauldin, Clemson (AP-1, UPI-1)
 Jay Calabrese, Duke (AP-1, UPI-1)
 Shelby Mansfield, North Carolina State (AP-1)
 Bob Davis, Virginia (UPI-1)

Defensive selections

Defensive ends
 Pete Sokalsky, North Carolina State (AP-1, UPI-1)
 Butch Sursavage, Clemson (AP-1, UPI-1)

Defensive tackles
 Dennis Byrd, North Carolina State (AP-1, UPI-1)
 Chuck Stavins, Duke (AP-1)
 Steve Cox, South Carolina (UPI-1)

Middle guards
 Joe Fratangelo, North Carolina (AP-1, UPI-1)

Linebackers
 Bob Matheson, Duke (AP-1, UPI-1)
 Bill Hecht, Clemson (AP-1, UPI-1)

Defensive backs
 Tony Golmont, North Carolina State (AP-1, UPI-1)
 Joe Carazo, Wake Forest (AP-1, UPI-1)
 Bob Sullivan, Maryland (AP-1, UPI-1)
 Benny Galloway, South Carolina (AP-1, UPI-1)

Key
Bold = consensus first-team All-ACC players selected to the first team by both the AP and UPI
AP = Associated Press, chosen by writers
UPI = United Press International

See also
1965 College Football All-America Team

References

All-Atlantic Coast Conference football team
All-Atlantic Coast Conference football teams